is a trans-Neptunian object first observed on 26 March 2014, at Cerro Tololo Inter-American Observatory in La Serena, Chile. It is a possible dwarf planet, a member of the scattered disc, whose orbit extends into the inner Oort cloud. Discovered by Scott Sheppard and Chad Trujillo, the object's existence was revealed on 29 August 2016. Both the orbital period and aphelion distance of this object are well constrained.  had the largest barycentric aphelion until 2018.

Orbit 

Using the Solar System Barycenter as the orbital frame of reference, 's extremely elongated orbit (eccentricity = 0.98) has a perihelion of 36.1 AU, an aphelion of ~4,050 AU and a barycentric orbital period of ~92,400 years. The latter values are the largest known for any Solar System body that is not a long-period comet. Based on the barycentric orbital period,  takes roughly 5 times longer than Sedna to orbit the Sun.

 last passed through perihelion around late 1965.

See also 
List of Solar System objects by greatest aphelion
List of Solar System objects most distant from the Sun

Notes

References

External links 
 
 

Inner Oort cloud
Minor planet object articles (unnumbered)

20140326